GPS2 may refer to:
GPS2 (gene)
 Global Positioning System